Animal is a 2005 direct-to-video film directed by David J. Burke and starring Ving Rhames, Terrence Howard, Chazz Palminteri, and Jim Brown. It was written by David C. Johnson. The film's profits were the subject of a lawsuit against the film's distributor, DEJ Productions. The case was still active into the year 2011. It was followed up by a 2007 sequel, Animal 2. The story of Willie Lynch is mentioned in the film, and passed on from father to son to half-brother. The film holds that the Lynch story is factual although it has been proved to be a modern forgery.

Cast
Ving Rhames as James "Animal" Allen
Terrence Howard as Darius
Chazz Palminteri as Kasada
Jim Brown as Berwell
Wes Studi as Creeper
Faizon Love as Double T
Paula Jai Parker as Reecy
Beverly Todd as Latresse
Taraji Penda Henson as Ramona
Kaly Cordova as Prisoner

References

External links

Animal at Videoet

2005 films
Direct-to-video drama films
Films directed by David J. Burke
2000s action drama films
2005 drama films
2000s English-language films
American action drama films